Hélène Michel-Wolfromm was a French gynecologist known for her work on the sexual problems encountered by French women.

Early life and education 
Michel-Wolfromm was born in Paris on December 4, 1914 and died on April 5, 1969 from lung cancer. She studied medicine with a focus in gynecology in Paris and graduated in 1938. Michel-Wolfromm was the first in France to apply psychosomatic medicine to the field of gynecology. She focused on sexology and a psychosomatic approach to gynecological problems. She also spoke with the press about sexual problems experienced by women. She talked about sexuality as 'that thing' when talking to her patients, and considered female mental instability a fear of aging. The female patients she saw were referred to her by other doctors who no longer wished to treat them. In her later years she defended the right of women to obtain birth control.

After her death in 1969, an obituary by Raoul Palmer was published in Gynécologie et Obstétrique, and second obituary appeared in La Presse Médicale.

Selected publications

References

Further reading 

1914 births
1969 deaths
Women physicians
French gynaecologists
Birth control activists